Atiq-ur-Rehman (born 24 April 1984) is a Pakistani first-class cricketer who plays for Water and Power Development Authority.

References

External links
 

1984 births
Living people
Pakistani cricketers
Water and Power Development Authority cricketers
Cricketers from Gujranwala
Central Punjab cricketers